Antonio Rampoldi was an Argentine film editor who worked on around fifty films during his career. Many of these were made during the Golden Age of Argentine Cinema.

Selected filmography
A Light in the Window (1942) 
 Swan Song (1945)
 Valentina (1950)

References

Bibliography 
 Fabbro, Gabriela. Mirtha Legrand: Del Cine a la Televisión: La Perdurabilidad de un Clásico. Universidad Austral, 2006.

External links 
 

Year of birth unknown
Year of death unknown
Argentine film editors